The English Miniature Bull Terrier is a breed with origins in the extinct English White Terrier, the Dalmatian and the Bulldog. The first existence is documented in 1872 in The Dogs of British Island.

Description

Appearance

Miniature Bull Terriers have short, fine, and glossy coats that are very close to the skin, like Bull Terriers. They are accepted in the ring to be white, white with another color, or fully colored. However, like the Bull Terriers, any blue or liver-colored coats are undesirable. These dogs require minimal grooming.

In the early 1900s, the difference between the breeds was determined by the dog's weight. However, this led to Miniature Bull Terriers becoming so small and fine that they looked more like a Chihuahua than a Bull Terrier. So, in the 1970s, the weight limit was replaced with a height limit of under fourteen inches. They are usually no smaller than ten inches.  According to the AKC, miniature bull terriers' weight must be proportionate to its height. However, they tend to range anywhere from 20–35  lbs.

The Miniature Bull Terriers have a very bold build. They have very muscular shoulders and a full body. Like the Bull Terrier, they have a head described as "egg-shaped". It is flat on top with a Roman nose. The eyes are triangular and closely set. The ears are carried erect and are not cropped or otherwise altered. The tail is carried horizontally rather than vertically.

Temperament
Like Bull Terriers, Miniature Bull Terriers are loving and, like many terrier breeds, they can be stubborn at times; but despite this they make great dogs for people with limited space.

Miniature Bull Terriers are known to be stubborn and courageous. Despite their diminutive stature, they will readily challenge larger dogs. However, as with any dog, owners can reduce the likelihood of confrontations by providing appropriate training. They are very energetic and playful and love people, but care must be taken as they are variable around other dogs.

Miniature Bull Terriers require little grooming. A quick brushing once a day or a few times a week is sufficient. Sunscreen must be used on any sparse white sections of fur around the face, ears, hindquarters or stomach when outdoors (especially in summer between the hours of 10am and 2pm) to avoid sunburn and cancer.

Health
Miniature Bull Terriers are prone to many health problems (physiologic and psychologic), and anyone considering adopting a bull terrier must be aware of these issues.
Deafness occurs in both colored and white Miniature Bull Terriers. Puppies can be born unilaterally deaf (deaf in one ear) or bilaterally deaf (deaf in both ears). Deaf dogs should not be bred due to deafness being hereditary. BEAP (or BAER) testing is done on puppies prior to sale to discover which puppies have hearing problems.

Lethal Acrodermatitis or LAD is a lethal genetic degenerative disease found in Miniature Bull Terriers. It starts appearing in puppies around the age of 4 weeks. The usual black color of affected puppies will start to appear diluted and turn liverish, due to a zinc deficiency which results in a terrible skin condition, dysfunction of their overall system and eventually premature death. A new DNA test was released to test breeding stock and ensure LAD-clear puppies.

Miniature Bull Terriers are also susceptible to having luxating patellas. This is a knee problem common in small dogs. It can be treated by surgery. 

Polycystic kidney disease (PKD) and Bull Terrier hereditary nephritis (BTHN) are autosomal dominant diseases. PKD is diagnosed by an Ultrasonic scan by a specialist veterinarian. BTHN is diagnosed by a UPC test. Dogs with a score of .3 or below are considered clear of the disease. Clearing breeding stock prior to use ensures that progeny are not affected by the disease.

Miniature Bull Terriers are also susceptible to eye problems such as primary lens luxation. PLL is a late-onset disease that typically affects dogs between the ages of mid-2 and 7. Younger and older cases are known. In September 2009 a definitive DNA test was released by the Animal Health Trust. This test gives three results: Clear, Carrier, or Affected.

Aortic valve stenosis and mitral valve dysplasia are heart diseases. Diagnosis is made by color doppler echocardiography scanning by a specialist veterinarian.

Disorders of the skin of a Miniature Bull Terrier can occur. Pyotraumatic dermatitis (hot spots), allergic reactions, and hives can be problematic. 
U.K. and U.S. breed surveys show an average lifespan of 10-14 years.

History
When the Bull Terrier breed was first created in 19th century England, it was about the same size as the Miniature Bull Terrier. Miniature Bull Terriers were granted membership in the American Kennel Club (AKC) on May 14, 1991 (effective January 1, 1992).

Interbreeding
Interbreeding, the process of mating together a Miniature Bull Terrier and Bull Terrier, is allowed, but only for a short time, in Australia, New Zealand, and the United Kingdom. Interbreeding is undertaken to reduce the incidence of Primary Lens Luxation in the Miniature. The Bull Terrier does not carry the PLL gene, so all progeny are phenotypically normal for the disease.

See also
 Dogs portal
 List of dog breeds
Bull Terrier

References

External links

FCI breeds
Terriers
Dog breeds originating in England
Vulnerable Native Breeds